Religion in Guinea-Bissau is diverse, with no particular religion comprising an absolute majority of the population. Islam is the most widely professed faith, and significant populations of Christians and adherents of Traditional Faiths are also present in the country.

The CIA World Factbook (2020 estimate) states that around 46.1% of the population are Muslims, 30.6% adhere to Folk religions, 18.9% are Christians, and 4.4% are non-religious or practice other religions. Meanwhile, the US State Department mentions that estimates vary greatly and cites the Pew Forum data (2020) of 46% Muslim, 31% indigenous religious practices, and 19% Christian.

Sunni Islam, including that of Sufi-oriented, are most concentrated in the northern and northeastern parts of the country. Practitioners of traditional indigenous religious beliefs generally live in all but the northern parts of the country. Christians are mostly found along the coastal regions, and belong to the Roman Catholic Church (including Portuguese Guinea-Bissauans) and various Protestant denominations. Christians are concentrated in Bissau and other large towns.

Islam

Most Guinea-Bissau's Muslims belong to Sunni Islam and follow Sufi orders. Islam is practiced most widely by the Fula, Soninke, Susu and Mandinka ethnic groups, and Muslims generally live in the north and northeast. 

Islam arrived in Guinea-Bissau before the 12th-century with trans-Saharan traders. Initial growth of Islam was limited to the rulers and trading elites of Guinea-Bissau. Major expansion of Islam among the mainstream happened in the 18th and 19th centuries, after the invasion by Biafada kingdom, and the waves of Fulani jihads that arrived from the north led by Musa Ibrahim, Ibrahim Sori, El Hadj Umar Tall and Coli Tenguella.

Christianity

Christianity arrived in Guinea-Bissau with Portuguese traders and missionaries in the 15th century, but only in its coastal regions. Active missionary efforts started only in the 20th century, and in 1977 it became a diocese of the Holy See. Protestant mission arrived in Guinea-Bissau in 1939, and Evangelical Churches have been active through the second half of the 20th century. The Christian missions became a target of destruction during the 1999 civil war in Guinea-Bissau.

According to the 2009 and 1991 censuses of Guinea-Bissau, the practice of Christianity has grown from 15% in 1991 to 22.1% of the total population in 2009; however, Christianity remains concentrated in the coastal regions of the country. Despite the majority of Christian community in Guinea-Bissau belongs to Roman Catholicism recent years there is a significant increase in Protestants and Evangelicals, especially between animist population, because of their missionary work. It is estimated that by 2050 there will be more than 30% Christians in the country as the result of many indigenous people converting to Christianity.

Law

Foreign missionaries operate in the country without restriction. The Constitution provides for freedom of religion, and the Government generally respected this right in practice though religious groups do have to have licenses. In 2015, the US government received no reports of societal abuses or discrimination based on religious belief or practice.

See also
Christianity in Guinea-Bissau
Islam in Guinea-Bissau
Roman Catholicism in Guinea-Bissau

References